Karen O'Leary is a New Zealand schoolteacher, comedian and actress. She plays Officer O'Leary in Wellington Paranormal.

Biography 
O'Leary grew up in Miramar, Wellington and attended Wellington High School and Victoria University. She graduated with a bachelor's degree in education and is an early childhood teacher in Wellington. She got involved in acting when casting director Tina Cleary, the parent of one of the children at the centre, encouraged her to audition for a part in the 2014 film What We Do in the Shadows. O'Leary played Officer O'Leary in the film and continues the same role in the spin-off television series Wellington Paranormal.

In 2018, O'Leary appeared in the comedy film The Breaker Upperers.

In 2020, O'Leary presented educational activities on Home Learning TV, a dedicated New Zealand television channel for children learning at home due to school closures during the national lockdown to control the COVID-19 pandemic.

Karen lives in Wellington with her son Melvyn and her partner, Eilish Wilson.

References

Living people
21st-century New Zealand actresses
New Zealand comedians
21st-century New Zealand educators
Victoria University of Wellington alumni
Year of birth missing (living people)
New Zealand LGBT comedians
New Zealand lesbian actresses
Lesbian comedians
Family